Étienne Marcel is an 1879 opera in 4 acts by Camille Saint-Saëns to a libretto by Louis Gallet.

Roles
Étienne Marcel, prévôt des marchands (baritone)
Robert de Loris, écuyer du Dauphin (tenor)
Eustache (baritone)
Robert de Clermont, maréchal de Normandie (bass)
Jehan Maillard (bass)
Pierre, jeune seigneur, ami de Robert (tenor)
L'Hôtelier (tenor)
Béatrix, fille d'Étienne Marcel (soprano)
Le Dauphin Charles (contralto)
Marguerite, mère de Béatrix
Un héraut (tenor)
Un artisan (baritone)
Denis, serviteur d'Étienne Marcel (tenor)
Un soldat (tenor)

Recordings
Radio broadcast recording: Étienne Marcel – Alain Fondary; Béatrix – Michèle Lagrange; Eustache – Franck Ferrari; Robert de Loris – Daniel Galvez-Vallejo; Jean Maillard – Philippe Fourcade; Marguerite/le dauphin Charles – Alexandra Papadjakou; Choeur de l'Opéra national de Montpellier, Choir of the Opéra de Strasbourg, Orchestre national de Montpellier Languedoc-Roussillon, conductor Hubert Soudant, 11 July 1994

References

Operas
Operas by Camille Saint-Saëns
French-language operas
1879 operas